Cape Royale is a census-designated place and unincorporated community in San Jacinto County, Texas, United States. The population was 670 at the 2010 census. Prior to the 2010 census Cape Royale and Oakhurst CDPs were part of Oakhurst city, which has been disincorporated.

Geography
Cape Royale is located at  (30.653043, -95.126539).

References

Unincorporated communities in San Jacinto County, Texas
Census-designated places in San Jacinto County, Texas
Greater Houston
Unincorporated communities in Texas